The Reckoning is a forthcoming true crime television drama about the life of, and horrific offences committed by, the British DJ and television personality Jimmy Savile, with Steve Coogan portraying Savile.

Premise
The four-part series is a biographical account of the life of the infamous Jimmy Savile. After he died, it came to light that he had been a prolific predator and sex offender. The series covers Savile's upbringing, career and sexual offences.

Cast
Steve Coogan as Jimmy Savile
Gemma Jones as Agnes Kelly
Robert Emms as Ray Teret

Production
The production was announced in October 2020, and was criticised before filming was underway. Richard Morrison, writing in The Times, stated that, as it was commissioned by the BBC (the corporation that was accused of turning a blind eye to Savile's crimes), it felt "less an act of contrition than of exploitation." Similarly, Pragya Argawal, writing in The Independent stated: 
However, Ben Lawrence writing in The Daily Telegraph, said that the victims deserved "better than the kneejerk hysteria that has surfaced about The Reckoning", and that "... the question is not whether we should make a drama like The Reckoning, but how we do so."

Steve Coogan himself announced that playing Savile was not a decision that "... (he) took lightly." "Neil McKay has written an intelligent script tackling sensitively an horrific story which - however harrowing - needs to be told."

Work on the production started in early October 2021, and has been noted filming in the north west of England and in North Wales.

In light of the controversy surrounding the series and the events regarding the death of Queen Elizabeth II, the drama was first expected to be broadcast by the BBC in 2022, before being pushed back to 2024 and then later pushed forward to 2023. At the time, a source said, “The four-part drama is being edited in such a meticulous and careful way, so as not to create more pain and suffering for Savile’s victims.”

References

External links
 

2023 British television series debuts
2020s British crime drama television series
BBC crime drama television shows
2020s British television miniseries
English-language television shows
Television shows set in England
Jimmy Savile